Katherine Fowler may refer to:
 Katherine Philips, poet
Kathy Fowler, medical reporter
Katharine Fowler-Billings, geologist

See also
Fowler (surname)